is a Japanese manga series written and illustrated by Okayado. The series is published in Japan by Tokuma Shoten in their Monthly Comic Ryū magazine and by Seven Seas Entertainment in the United States, with the chapters collected and reprinted into seventeen tankōbon volumes to date. Monster Musume revolves around Kimihito Kurusu, a Japanese student whose life is thrown into turmoil after accidentally becoming involved with the "Interspecies Cultural Exchange" program.

An anime adaptation aired from July to September 2015, and is licensed by Sentai Filmworks under the title Monster Musume: Everyday Life with Monster Girls.

A light novel based on the series, titled Monster Musume – Monster Girls on the Job!, with Yoshino Origuchi, author of Monster Girl Doctor, as the writer, was published by Seven Seas Entertainment on August 29, 2020.

Synopsis

Setting

For years, the Japanese government had kept a secret: mythical creatures such as centaurs, mermaids, harpies, and lamaias are real. Three years before the start of the story, the government revealed the existence of these creatures and passed the "Interspecies Cultural Exchange Act". Since then, these creatures, known as "liminals", have become a part of human society, living with ordinary families like foreign exchange students and au-pair visitors, but with other duties and restrictions (the primary restrictions being that liminals and humans are forbidden from harming each other or procreating).

Plot
In Asaka, Saitama, Kimihito Kurusu is a normal student who initially has no connection to the exchange program. However, when coordinator Kuroko Smith delivers the very scared and embarrassed Miia to his door by mistake, he cannot bring himself to send her away and allows her to live at his home, taking advantage of his parents' extended absence. As the story continues, Kimihito meets and gives shelter to other female liminals, each of a different species. Some arrive more or less by accident, while others are forced upon him by Smith or simply insinuate themselves into the house. Before long, Kimihito finds himself in a hectic environment, struggling to live in harmony with his new housemates while dealing with both their constant affectionate/romantic advances and the dramas of helping them get along in the human world. The situation takes on a new twist after he is told that because of expected changes in the law dealing with human-liminal relationships, he is expected to marry one of the girls as a test case, thus increasing their competition for his attention. However, as time passes, other liminal girls become attracted to him and begin to vie for his attention, much to Kimihito's embarrassment and the annoyance of his housemates.

Media

Manga
Okayado, a pen name of Takemaru Inui, published the prototype for Monster Musume in Comic Ryu's Anthology Comic Kemomo 02, published by Tokuma Shoten, in 2011. He then reworked the story into a serialized publication, and the first chapter was published in Tokuma Shoten's seinen manga magazine Monthly Comic Ryū on 19 March 2012.  The first collected tankōbon volume was released on 13 September 2012.  The series moved to online-only serialization when Comic Ryū changed formats on 19 June 2018. The series has been licensed in English by Seven Seas Entertainment and in German by Kazé.

A four volume anthology of four-panel spin-offs with stories by Shake-O (Nurse Hitomi's Monster Infirmary), SaQ Tottori (Kyōkai Senjō no Limbo), and Cool-Kyou-Sinnjya (I Can't Understand What My Husband Is Saying, Komori-san Can't Decline), titled  was published by Tokuma Shoten between 12 August 2015 and February 2016.  Seven Seas Entertainment also licensed the spinoff.

Volume list
The series has been collected into seventeen volumes, all but the most recent of which have been republished in English.

Anime
In September 2014, the Monster Musume website ran a series of polls asking what readers would want to see in an anime adaptation.  This was followed in March by the announcement that a television series would begin airing in July 2015. The series, directed by Tatsuya Yoshihara and scripted by Kazuyuki Fudeyasu, was animated by the animation studio Lerche. It stars Junji Majima as the voice of Kurusu Kimihito, Sora Amamiya as Miia, Ari Ozawa as Papi, Natsuki Aikawa as Centorea, Mayuka Nomura as Suu, Haruka Yamazaki as Mero, Sakura Nakamura as Rachnera, Ai Kakuma as Lala, Yū Kobayashi as Ms. Smith, Momo Asakura as Manako, Rei Mochizuki as Zombina, Yurika Kubo as Tionisia, and Saori Ōnishi as Doppel.  The opening theme song, titled , is performed by the voice actresses for Miia, Papi, Centorea, Suu, Mero, and Rachnera; and the closing song, is performed by the voice actresses for Ms. Smith, Manako, Tionishia, Zombina, and Doppel.

The series aired in Japan on Tokyo MX, Sun TV, KBS, BS11, and AT-X.  It is accompanied by a series of anime shorts, titled Hobo Mainichi OO! Namappoi Dōga (Almost Daily __! Sort of Live Video), which were streamed semi-daily on the Japanese video sharing site Niconico, the service that also streamed the series regular.  The shorts were available for a period of 24 hours, with compilation episodes being streamed on the weekends. The series is streamed by Daisuki in Central and Latin America, Indonesia, Singapore, Thailand, and the Philippines.  The series is also streamed by Crunchyroll in the United States, Canada, the United Kingdom, Ireland, South Africa, Australia, New Zealand, Latin America, the Netherlands, Scandinavia, and Turkey. The series is licensed by Sentai Filmworks in North America.

An original anime DVD was released with the manga's eleventh volume on 11 November 2016. It was directed by Tatsuya Yoshihara and written by Kazuyuki Fudeyasu, with animation by Lerche. The OAD adapts chapter 17 of the manga, which was included in the fourth tankōbon volume. A second original anime DVD was released with the manga's twelfth volume on 13 April 2017. An English version was released on 25 July 2017.

Video games
Coinciding with the release of the first anime episode, it was announced that an online PC game adapted from the series would be released by DMM Games in 2015. The game was released on 21 December 2015.  At the height of its popularity, it had around 200,000 players. The game was shut down on 22 November 2016.

Reception
As of 1 September 2014, over a million copies of the tankōbon volumes had been sold.  The series reached 2.3 million copies in print on 13 February 2016.

The first ten volumes of the English translation have appeared on the New York Times Manga Best Sellers list, prior to the list's discontinuation:
Volume 1 stayed on the list for six weeks; for the first two weeks it ranked at number 1.
Volume 2 stayed on the list for seven weeks (ranking among the top 10 for five nonconsecutive); the first two weeks as number 2.
Volume 3 stayed for five weeks, ranking at number 1 for the first three weeks.
Volume 4 stayed for five nonconsecutive weeks, debuting at number 1.
Volume 5 stayed for three weeks, ranking at number 1 for the first two.
Volume 6 stayed for four weeks, beginning at number 2 on the first week, and peaking at number 1 on the second week.
Volume 7 stayed for seven weeks, debuting at number 1.
Volume 8 stayed for five nonconsecutive weeks, debuting at number 1.
Volume 9 stayed for four weeks, debuting at number 1.
Volume 10 stayed for two weeks, ranking at number 3 for the first.

Two volumes of the English translation of Monster Musume: I Heart Monster Girls have appeared on the New York Times Manga Best Sellers list:
Volume 1 stayed for three weeks, debuting at number 1.
Volume 2 stayed for two weeks, ranking at number 8 for the first.

See also

Rosario + Vampire, a monster manga series that predates Monster Musume debut
12 Beast, another manga series by the same author
Monster Girl Doctor, a light novel series by Yoshino Origuchi and Z-Ton

Notes

References

External links

  
  
 
 

2015 anime television series debuts
2017 anime OVAs
Anime series based on manga
Fantasy anime and manga
Harem anime and manga
Classical mythology in anime and manga
Legendary creatures in popular culture
Lerche (studio)
Paranormal romance comics
Romantic comedy anime and manga
Seinen manga
Sentai Filmworks
Seven Seas Entertainment titles
Animated television series about monsters
Television series based on classical mythology
Toho Animation
Tokuma Shoten manga
Works published under a pseudonym
Urban fantasy anime and manga